The Aohan (Khalkha-Mongolian:Аохан/Aohan) are a Southern Mongol subgroup in Aohan Banner, Inner Mongolia, China.

See also 
 Wuhuan Mongols
 Demographics of China

Southern Mongols
Mongols